Amanda Coplin is an American novelist. She was born in Wenatchee, Washington and went on to study at and graduate from the University of Oregon and University of Minnesota.

In 2013 Coplin won a Whiting Writer's Award and was named to the National Book Foundation's "5 Under 35".

The Orchardist
The Orchardist is a 2012 book and Coplin's debut novel and was released through HarperCollins on August 21, 2012. The work deals with an orchardist that takes in two pregnant teenage sisters that are fleeing an abusive pimp that enslaved them in his brothel.

Critical reception for The Orchardist has been positive and the work received praise from NPR, the Denver Post, and The Washington Post. The work went on to win the 2013 American Book Award and Washington State Book Award for Fiction.

References

External links

Living people
People from Wenatchee, Washington
University of Oregon alumni
University of Minnesota alumni
University of Oregon faculty
Writers from Portland, Oregon
American Book Award winners
Year of birth missing (living people)